Dumfries YMCA Football Club are a football club from the town of Dumfries in Scotland. They originally competed in the Dumfries & District Amateur Football League (DDAFL) prior to its disbanding before switching to the South of Scotland Football League for the 2014–15 season.  Home matches are played at Dumfries High School in Dumfries.

History
Dumfries YMCA FC started off in the early 1970s, playing in the youth leagues in their local area of Dumfries and Galloway. It wasn't until 1976 that the decision was made for the club to enter a team in to the DDAFL's League Division 2. Within a few seasons, in 1981, the club achieved promotion to League Division 1, the top flight of the DDAFL, and remained there until the league disbanded in 2013.

After that promotion in 1981, the club went on to win 6 League Division 1 titles within a ten-year period. The first of which came in 1984 and the last of which came in 1993. Those 6 titles rank as 4th in the all-time list of DDAFL League Division 1 winners. The club have also finished as league runners-up a total of 7 times to date.

After the DDAFL disbanded, the club entered their team in the South of Scotland Football League, where they continue to compete. They have yet to hit the heights of the team of the 1980s, failing to win a competition since the 2011/12 season.

Dumfries YMCA withdrew from the South of Scotland League midway through the 2019-20 season.

Home Ground and Club Colours
The club's official home ground is MacLeod Pavilion at Kingholm Quay but they play all home matches on a 4G surface at the nearby Dumfries High School.

The club's home kits are all-red with white trim and their away kits are all-blue with white trim.

Current squad

Non-Playing Staff
As of 01 October 2018

Honours

League Division 1

Winners - 83/84, 84/85, 85/86, 87/88, 91/92, 92/93

Runners-up - 87/88, 90/91, 98/99, 99/00, 00/01, 02/03, 04/05

League Division 2

Winners - 80/81

Queen of the South Cup

Winners - 85/86, 86/87, 95/96

British Legion Cup

Winners - 85/86, 87/88, 90/91, 93/94, 2011/12

Runners-up - 86/87, 88/89, 96/97

SOVRO Cup

Winners - 85/86

Burns Cup
 
Winners - 97/98

Runners-up - 96/97, 01/02

Tayleurian Cup

Winners - 98/99

Runners-up - 93/94, 94/95, 96/97

Skol Cup

Runners-up - 83/84

Nivison Cup

Winners - 86/87, 91/92, 94/95

McCall Cup

Runners-up - 06/07

Octocentinery Cup

Winners - 85/86

South of Scotland Cup
 
Runners-up - 83/84

References

External links
 Official website

Football clubs in Dumfries and Galloway
South of Scotland Football League teams
Sports clubs founded by the YMCA
Sport in Dumfries